Mr. Nobody may refer to:

A nickname for Sywald Skeid, Romanian-born man
Mr. Nobody (comics), a fictional character from the DC Comics universe
Mr. Nobody (Mr. Men), part of the Mr. Men series of books by Roger Hargreaves
Mr. Nobody (film), a 2009 film starring Jared Leto and directed by Jaco Van Dormael
Mr. Nobody (soundtrack), original score to the film
"Mr Nobody" (Anžej Dežan song), a song by Anžej Dežan
Mr. Nobody, a character from The Fast and the Furious film series
"Mr. Nobody", a song by Reks from Rhythmatic Eternal King Supreme

See also 
 Nobody (disambiguation)